William Robert (Bill) Dudman ( 4 December 1925 – 29 September 1984) was Archdeacon of Lindsey from 1975 until his death.

Dudman was educated at King's College, Taunton; the University of Hull and Lincoln Theological College. After three years in the Royal Navy he was ordained Deacon in 1952; and Priest in 1953. After curacies at Shiregreen, Wombwell and Frodingham he was Industrial Chaplain to the Bishop of Lincoln from 1957 to 1971. He was Fourth Canon Residentiary of Lincoln Cathedral from 1971; and its Treasurer from 1975.

Notes

1925 births
1984 deaths
Archdeacons of Lindsey
20th-century English Anglican priests
People educated at King's College, Taunton
Alumni of the University of Hull
Alumni of Lincoln Theological College
20th-century Royal Navy personnel